On February 25, 2013, the Republic of Sierra Leone became the 31st Member State of the intergovernmental World Sports Alliance (WSA). The Membership Application and Membership Memorandum of Understanding were signed on behalf of the Government by Paul Kamara, the Minister of Sports. The WSA has 31 member states.

On December 1 7, 2012, the Republic of Tunisia became the 29th member state with the signing of the Membership Documents by Tarek Dhiab, the Minister of Youth and Sports. 

WSA-IGO was created following the adoption of the Rabat Declaration in Morocco, in May 2007 by the Kingdom of Morocco, the Republic of Niger, and the Dominican Republic, and its subsequent presentation and registration with the Economic and Social Council UN-ECOSOC (E/2007/NGO/1)(3) in July 2007. By April 2009 WSA had grown to include 24 Member states, increasing to 27 in January 2009, with a combined population base of 574 million.

Pursuant to the accession process, the Sports and Youth Minister of each member state becomes the lead representative of their government within WSA.

The decision to organize as an Intergovernmental Organization (IGO) was strategic. An IGO is an organization made up primarily of Sovereign States, referred to as its Member States, and requires the membership of a minimum of three (3) countries in order to qualify as an IGO. Examples of IGO’s include the United Nations, the European Union, and NATO.

This organizational form permits WSA to work in direct concert with its Member States through the Sports and Youth Ministries of each Member State on the social and academic aspects of the WSA programs. At the same time, this structure also enables WSA to work in direct contact with the Heads of State, the Prime Ministers and Ministers of each of its Member States on matters pertaining to the Public Private Partnerships in order to encourage and reinforce the participation of Countries in their own sustainable and responsible development.

Further, by providing access to the highest levels of governments, the IGO status also provides WSA with the means to broaden support among non Member States for the strategy of using education through sports to engage the youth of a country in order to educate and then involve them in the development of their communities and society at large. Bangladesh is the last member of WSA. They are the 34th membering country, it was held in 17th November 2019.

Current members
The member states are listed below with their respective dates of admission.

The table below uses the official names of the member states used by the WSA-IGO, and can also be sorted by their dates of admissions by clicking on the button in the column header.

Note: Member states with background color  and bold font are original members.

Footnotes
  United Nations Millennium Development Goals (1)
  Rabat Declaration(2) http://www.omdg.org/en/index.php?searchword=world+sports+allianc&ordering=&searchphrase=all&option=com_search
  UN- ECOSOC (E/2007/NGO/1) in July 2007. (3)
  AIESIS http://www.omdg.org/en/index.php?option=com_content&view=article&id=128&Itemid=70
  Regional Roundtables  held in Paris, Algiers, Brasília and Beijing respectively.(4)
  Public Private Partnership (PPP) as an innovative means of financing sustainable development.(5)
  Unleashing Entrepreneurship (6)

External links
 World Sports Alliance https://web.archive.org/web/20090419003351/http://worldsportsalliance.org/site/
 Intergovernmental Organization
 United Nations Millennium Development Goals 
 United Nations
 European Union
 NATO 
 UNDESA - www.un.org/esa/desa
 UNESCO - http://portal.unesco.org
 Unleashing Entrepreneurship, (http://www.undp.org/cpsd/report/index.html)
 AIESIS http://www.omdg.org/en/index.php?option=com_content&view=article&id=128&Itemid=70
 UN NGO IRENE http://www.unpan.org/NGO.asp
 EUPEA http://www.eupea.com
 CONFEJES https://web.archive.org/web/20080611172512/http://www.confejes.org/article159.html

World Sports Alliance
United Nations Economic and Social Council
World Sports Alliance